Irish Rifles may refer to:
Royal Ulster Rifles
London Irish Rifles
Cape Town Irish Volunteer Rifles
37th New York Volunteer Infantry Regiment